Antigua Guatemala Fútbol Club is a Guatemalan professional football team based in Antigua Guatemala. They compete in the Liga Nacional, the top tier of Guatemalan football. They play their home games at the Estadio Pensativo. They are nicknamed Los Panzas Verdes ("Green bellies") in reference to the local avocados and as represented by the green stripes on the team uniform.

History

The club was founded in 1958 by Dr. Miguel Ángel Soto Bustamante and Mr. Antonio Martínez Barrios with the colonial city as its home. The club's first president was Rogelio Toldeo Estrada and the club's first manager was César Rodríguez Gudiel.

After earning promotion to the maximum division (Liga Mayor "A") in the 1957–58 season, Antigua finished third in the 1959–60 league table.  However, they could not retain their level in the following years, suffering relegation after the 1964 season. After more than a decade in the Liga Mayor B, the club's administration was inherited by the Antigua Guatemala Municipality, and in December 1976, earned promotion back to the Liga Mayor "A", but were relegated two years later as the number of teams in the league was reduced from 18 to 12. Administration changed hands again and the team earned another promotion in 1979 after winning a tie-breaking third playoff match against Juca at the Estadio Mateo Flores, remaining in the top category until 1983, when a last-place finish on the standings relegated them once again.

Relegation in 1983 marked the beginning of a 16-year-long period in which the club went through financial strain and was unable to return to the top flight. In 1998 the team's administration was again given to the Municipality, and on 22 May 1999 they earned a spot in the now called Liga Nacional. In 2006 they were relegated after seven years in the top flight, in what had been their longest period of participation at the top level. As of 2011, they have competed in the Primera División de Ascenso.

Return to Liga Nacional in 2014
Antigua GFC will compete in Guatemala's highest-level league having purchased the position offered by the Heredia Jaguares from Izabal. For the 2015 season, the club kit will be supplied by Italian sports company Diadora.

Championship 
On December 20, 2015, Antigua won the Apertura for the first time. Since their first victory, they were champions of Guatemalan football for three consecutive years. In 2019, Antigua won its fourth Guatemalan League title.

Honours

Domestic honours

Leagues
 Liga Nacional de Guatemala and predecessors 
 Champions (4): Apertura 2015, Apertura 2016, Apertura 2017, Clausura 2019

Performance in international competitions
CONCACAF Champions League
2016–17 - Group Stage
CONCACAF League
2019 - Preliminary Round
CONCACAF League
2020 - Round of 16

Current squad

Out on loan

Managerial history

 César Rodríguez (1958)
 Jorge Tupinambá (1992–1995)
 Carlos Rosales (2000)
 Rodolfo Arias (2001)
 Mario Reig (2001–2002)
 Ever González (2009)
 Orlando A. Andrade (2009–2010)
 Daniel Orlando Berta (2010)
 Ricardo Carreño (2010)
 Jeff Korytoski (2010–2011)
 Jeff Korytoski (2013)
 Gabriel Castillo (2014)
 Mauricio Tapia (2014–2018)
 Roberto Montoya (2019-2020)
  Juan Antonio Torres (2020)
 Jeff Korytoski (2020-2021)
 Roberto Montoya (2021-2022)
 Ramiro Cepeda (2022- )

References

External links

 official team page (Spanish)
 Spanish Wikipedia page 
 Liga Primera team page

 
Football clubs in Guatemala
Association football clubs established in 1958
1958 establishments in Guatemala